Ortíz Morales, Jesús Manuel, also known as Ommalaga (born 24 January 1959), is a Spanish composer.

Career

Morales is an experimental and noise musician, audiovisual producer and academic researcher. He directs the Contemporary Music of CSMM, directs the digital lab ATI-Gabirol Lab and founded kinematic ensemble KinematikoM. He has a PhD in Audiovisual Communication, with specialization in the reconstruction of sonorous contexts of audiovisual synchronism, futuristic and Dadá. His thesis was on archeotechnology (El synchrociné de Charles Delacommune, UMA2012) and another on cinematic reconstructions (El ballet mecanique y el synchrociné, UMA2008). He has been professor int. in the superior Conservatories of Cordoba, Granada and Málaga (Harmony, Musical Forms and of Contemporary Music Workshops). 

He began as a rock musician (in Tabletom and Veneno). He became a symphonic and minimalist musician (with the young orchestra CSMM and later with the Málaga Symphonic orchestra). From approximately 1998 to the present, he worked in the styles of electroacoustic and noise and concrete music.

He was included by SGAE in the anthology of electroacoustic authors 2002-2003 for his work Kish. He has been an independent producer since 1982 with the alternative production company Ommalaga Productions, dedicated to experimental media and pedagogy.  He has performed works or tunings for various media such as RTVE series, RNE, RTVA, Canal SUR or Metro-Málaga. 

He developed some computer software (among others, the Rameau digital music encryption system). He developed works in reconstructive computer graphics. He is in possession of one of the Eduardo Ocón prizes of the Diputación de Málaga. He produced works for RCA, Nuevos Medios and CBS, notably the albums Mezclalina, and Si tu, si yo. He produced an audiovisual reconstruction of the film of 1924 Ballet mécanique.

Discography

Sirrush (2016)
Ea (2015)
Ki (2010)
Dilmún (2007)
Abzu (2005)
Antologia Electroacústica (2003)
Música contemporánea (2000) 
Pequeño salvaje (1987)
Algo tuyo (1985)
Rayya (1982) 
Recuerdos del futuro (1981)
Mezclalina (1980)

References
 Ommalaga: Organization chart, 
 Ortiz Morales: Discography, 
 La Opinión Newspaper 

1959 births
Living people
Experimental musicians
Noise musicians